William Watts was a British colonial governor, a sea captain under the Commonwealth sent to the Caribbean shortly after the English Restoration. He was Deputy Governor of Anguilla from 1660 to 1666, and also governed St Kitts.

Watts was an appointee of Francis Willoughby, 5th Baron Willoughby of Parham. On St Kitts he ran a profitable sugar cane estate using slave labour.

As an act of the Second Anglo-Dutch War, Watts sent an expedition against Saint Martin. It brought French retaliation on St Kitts.

References

Deputy Governors of Anguilla
Governors of British Saint Christopher